Pediasia matricella is a species of moth in the family Crambidae described by Georg Friedrich Treitschke in 1832. It is found in Italy, Austria, Hungary, Romania, Bulgaria, the Republic of Macedonia, Greece, Ukraine, Russia. In the east, the range extends to Transcaucasia, Asia Minor, Turkmenistan, Jordan, Syria, Iran and Israel.

Subspecies
Pediasia matricella matricella (Europe, southern Russia, Transcaucasia, Asia Minor, Jordan, Syria, Iran)
Pediasia matricella stenopterella (Amsel, 1949) (Mesopotamia, Turkmenistan)

References

External links
Lepiforum.de

Moths described in 1832
Crambini
Moths of Europe
Moths of Asia